"Hold On to Your Friends" is a song by Morrissey, released as a single in May 1994. It was the second single taken from the number 1 album Vauxhall and I.

Reaching number 48 in the UK Singles Chart, the single became Morrissey's lowest charting single until "Glamorous Glue" in 2011, which reached number 69.

Track listings

7" vinyl and cassette
 "Hold On to Your Friends"
 "Moon River"

12" vinyl and CD
 "Hold On to Your Friends"
 "Moon River" (extended version)

Musicians
 Morrissey: voice
 Alain Whyte: guitar
 Boz Boorer: guitar
 Jonny Bridgwood: bass guitar
 Woodie Taylor: drums

Reception
Ned Raggett of AllMusic thought the song featured a strong performance from the group but was "not one of the album's immediately strongest points", although it "isn't a bad listen at all."  He was more impressed by the cover version of Moon River on the B-side which had a "surprisingly affecting" performance from Morrissey and a good production.

Live performances
The song was performed live by Morrissey on his 1995 and 1997 tours.

References

Morrissey songs
1994 singles
Songs written by Morrissey
Songs written by Alain Whyte
Song recordings produced by Steve Lillywhite
1994 songs
Parlophone singles